Shalosh is an Israel based band originally established by Pianist Gadi Stern with drummer Matan Assayag and Bass player Daniel Benhorin in 2013 in Tel Aviv. David Michaeli replaced Daniel Benhorin as the double bass player. The band is mostly well known for its crossing genre style, mostly between Jazz Rock and electronic music. Shalosh have played well over 250 shows since 2013, all around the globe. The name Shalosh  refers to the Hebrew word for Three.

In 2014, Shalosh released their first album The Bell Garden. Israel Hayom named The Bell Garden album of the year.<ref>{{cite web|title=מארז תרבות 37: אלבומי השנה תשעד|url=http://www.nrg.co.il/online/47/ART2/625/950.html?hp=47&cat=309&loc=8|website=Israel Hayom|accessdate=16 September 2017}}</ref>

Shalosh released their second album Rules of Oppression in 2016.

DiscographyThe Bell Garden (March 2014)Rules of Oppression (2016)Onwards and Upwards (May 2019)Broken Balance'' (2020)

References

External links

 

Israeli rock music groups
Israeli electronic music groups
Israeli musical trios
Musical groups established in 2013
Musical groups from Tel Aviv
ACT Music artists
2013 establishments in Israel